Spyros Skondras (born 6 April 2001) is a Greek professional footballer who plays as a winger for Super League 2 club AEK Athens B.

References

2001 births
Living people
Greek footballers
Super League Greece 2 players
AEK Athens F.C. B players
Association football forwards
Footballers from Agrinio